Valenzuela Medical Center, formerly known as the Valenzuela General Hospital, is a government healthcare centre and hospital in Karuhatan, Valenzuela, Metro Manila, Philippines. The hospital is administered by the National Government through the Department of Health.

References

External links
 
 Official website of Valenzuela City
 

Hospitals in Metro Manila
Buildings and structures in Valenzuela, Metro Manila